Isòvol is a municipality in the province of Girona and autonomous community of Catalonia, Spain.

Religion

Churches
Church of Santa Maria, All

References

External links
 Government data pages 

Municipalities in Cerdanya (comarca)
Municipalities in the Province of Girona